Blastopsocus is a genus of common barklice in the family Psocidae. There are about nine described species in Blastopsocus.

Species
These nine species belong to the genus Blastopsocus:
 Blastopsocus angustus Smithers & Thornton, 1981
 Blastopsocus goodrichi Mockford, 2002
 Blastopsocus johnstoni Mockford, 2002
 Blastopsocus lithinus (Chapman, 1930)
 Blastopsocus mockfordi Badonnel, 1986
 Blastopsocus semistriatus (Walsh, 1862)
 Blastopsocus uncinatus (Thornton & Woo, 1973)
 Blastopsocus variabilis (Aaron, 1883)
 Blastopsocus walshi Mockford, 2002

References

Psocidae
Articles created by Qbugbot